On September 1–2, 2021, Hurricane Ida affected much of the Northeastern United States with catastrophic flash flooding and tornadoes. At least 55 people have died in the states of New Jersey, New York, Pennsylvania, Maryland, and Connecticut. The storm spawned seven tornadoes across Pennsylvania and New Jersey. Another tornado was reported in Massachusetts.

An EF1 tornado that tracked from Edgewater Park, New Jersey to Bristol, Pennsylvania prompted a rare tornado emergency for Bristol and Croydon, Pennsylvania, as well as Burlington, New Jersey. This was the first tornado emergency ever issued for a tropical cyclone as well as the first ever issued for the Northeastern United States.

Ida killed at least 54 people across the region. CoreLogic estimated that Ida caused an estimated $16 to 24 billion in flooding damage in the Northeastern United States. The National Hurricane Center (NHC) estimated that Ida caused between $18 billion to $22.5 billion in damage in the Northeastern United States, with a median estimate of at least $20 billion in damages.

Background
Ida was the third tropical system in a time period of several weeks to affect the Northeastern United States, after Tropical Storm Fred and Hurricane Henri in August. These storms dropped heavy rainfall, saturating the soil. New York City recorded  from August 16 to 30, which became the second largest amount of rain New York City had in the second half of August on record. Water levels in rivers were also higher than average, leaving much of the region susceptible to flooding.

Preparations
The Weather Prediction Center issued a High Risk of flash flooding for parts of West Virginia, Maryland, Pennsylvania, New Jersey, New York, and Connecticut.

Impact

Pennsylvania

At least five people were killed in Pennsylvania. A woman was killed in Upper Dublin Township, when a tree fell onto her house due to a tornado. In Bucks County, a man drowned in his vehicle in the Unami Creek. An EF2 tornado caused damage in Fort Washington, Upper Dublin Township, and Horsham Township in Montgomery County, Pennsylvania, knocking down trees and power lines and tearing the roof off of the Upper Dublin Police Department. The flooding was particularly severe on portions of Interstate 676, leading the highway to take several days to reopen and causing $715,000 to repair.  Also in Pennsylvania, an EF1 tornado struck Buckingham Township in Bucks County, and a tornado touched down in Oxford in Chester County. In Pittsburgh, a bus with over 40 people had to be rescued. Bucks County suffered both a tornado emergency and flash flood emergency simultaneously. Damage in Pennsylvania amounted to anywhere between $2.5 billion and $3.5 billion. This helped give Pennsylvania there 7th wettest September on record.

New Jersey

Newark International Airport was shut down, cancelling more than 400 flights. Ida significantly contributed to Newark's wettest September on record. An EF3 tornado with winds of  damaged or destroyed many homes and tossed cars in Mullica Hill, New Jersey. One unanchored frame home was completely leveled. Two people were injured by the tornado. In Millburn, Essex County, the Rahway River overflowed its banks, flooding the downtown area. More than 100 rescues were conducted. People were evacuated to the Millburn Library. In nearby Livingston, the Canoe Brook overflowed its banks, and flooding damaged several police, fire department, and public works vehicles. One fire department SUV was swept away while rescuing a person in a trapped car. Around 500 rescues occurred in Manville, Somerset County, and 100 houses were estimated to be uninhabitable. In nearby Bound Brook, a NJ Transit train was stuck in floodwaters. In A total of 30 people were killed in New Jersey, making this the second deadliest tropical cyclone in the history of the state. Damage in New Jersey amounted to anywhere between $8 billion and $10 billion.

New York State

At least three people were killed in Westchester County. More than 200 cars were abandoned on roads. A man was killed near the Saw Mill River Parkway after his car was submerged. A total of 18 people died in New York State. Initial estimates, according to New York Governor Kathy Hochul, said flooding caused more than $50 million in damage in New York State. However, more updated numbers reveal damage in New York amounted to between $7.5 billion and $9 billion.

New York City and Long Island
In the New York Subway System, 17 trains were trapped and service was halted until the morning of September 2. Everyone trapped was evacuated, with no casualties. At the US Open tennis site in Flushing in New York City, 18 people were rescued. The New York Mets game against the Miami Marlins at Citi Field was postponed due to the approaching storm. A total of 13 people were killed in New York City, with 11 of them occurring when basements of apartments flooded. In one of the incidents, a toddler was killed. A man's body was recovered from the Gowanus Canal late on September 2. The maximum amount of rainfall in Staten Island of  made it the 9th wettest tropical cyclone in New York. The flooding was so bad that Bill de Blasio had to ban all non-essential travel on roads until 5am on September 2.

Early on the morning of September 2, more than 13,200 customers lost power in Long Island. The Long Island Railroad suspended service systemwide due to severe weather conditions.

New England
A Connecticut State Trooper sergeant was hospitalized after he and his police vehicle were swept away by floodwaters from the Pomperaug River in Litchfield County, early on September 2. He died later that day. The state of Connecticut saw 20,000 power outages. Multiple roads closed due to flooding. An EF0 tornado was spawned in Dennis, Massachusetts, causing minor damage to two homes and knocking down three large oak trees.

Aftermath
States of emergency were declared in New York, including in New York City, New Jersey, and Connecticut. President of the United States Joe Biden stated that the Federal Emergency Management Agency (FEMA) was responding to the catastrophe.

New Jersey
Several New Jersey public school districts delayed or cancelled classes because of flooding or severe weather damage. Newark Liberty International Airport suffered flooding in the terminals, and all departures were grounded. Operations continued the following morning with flight delays and cancellations. On September 2, it was announced that, because of the major flooding around SHI Stadium, the Rutgers–Temple home opener game would be postponed. Governor of New Jersey Phil Murphy toured Mullica Hill. He said that the state needed improved infrastructure. Murphy said he would be requesting a major disaster declaration from the federal government, and promised to discuss storm-response measures with President Biden late on September 2. Murphy also called the flooding "historic by any measure." Murphy also attributed the storm to climate change, saying that "there's no denying it". The governor toured downtown Millburn. He stated that businesses and non-profits with up to 50 employees that were damaged by Hurricane Ida would be qualified for up to $5,000 in repercussions.

New York
Governor of New York Kathy Hochul said that the state needed "massive cleanup". The New York City Department of Buildings investigated the conditions of the basements where people had drowned during Ida. Five of the six basements were found to be illegally-converted apartments. Mayor of New York Bill de Blasio presented the Climate Driven Rain Response Plan, which is expected to create a new and improved warning system. De Blasio also announced the formation of the 30-day Extreme Weather Response Task Force to look into how the city could be more ready to face such weather. The mayor also laid out the potential for travel restrictions, door-to-door warnings, phone alerts, and faster evacuations in the future. On September 6, President Biden approved Hochul's request for a major disaster declaration. On the same day, FEMA Administrator Deanne Criswell, De Blasio, Senator Chuck Schumer, and Congresswoman Alexandria Ocasio-Cortez visited Queens, one of the hardest-hit areas in New York City. AOC attributed the impacts to climate change, and also said that "[we] needed more advance notice from the [National Weather Service]." She also stated that most of the flooding was caused by problems with the sewer system.

Governor Kathy Hochul and Mayor Bill de Blasio allocated $27 million to assist undocumented residents who are not eligible for FEMA relief funds.

References

Hurricane Ida
Northeastern United States